Nectandra hypoleuca is a species of plant in the family Lauraceae. It is endemic to Costa Rica.

References

hypoleuca
Endemic flora of Costa Rica
Taxonomy articles created by Polbot